Dion Dreesens (born 30 April 1993) is a Dutch swimmer.

He competed at the 2012 Summer Olympics in the men's 200 metre freestyle, finishing in 27th place in the heats, failing to qualify for the semifinals.

Dreesens qualified for the 2016 Summer Olympics in Rio de Janeiro in the 200 metre freestyle and the 4 × 200 metre freestyle relay. He finished 27th in the heats of the 200 m freestyle, and finished 7th in the final with the relay.

References

1993 births
Living people
Dutch male freestyle swimmers
Olympic swimmers of the Netherlands
Swimmers at the 2012 Summer Olympics
Swimmers at the 2016 Summer Olympics
Swimmers at the 2010 Summer Youth Olympics
People from Venray
Sportspeople from Limburg (Netherlands)